"Carrion"/"Apologies to Insect Life" is a double A-side single by British Sea Power. Both songs feature on their debut album, The Decline of British Sea Power, and this was the first single to be issued after its release. Reaching No. 36 in the UK, the single received rave reviews and was the band's first Top 40 hit. Despite videos being made for both tracks and the nature of the release, most of the airplay and coverage was given to "Carrion", the more pop-oriented song, which is considered by many fans to be one of the band's defining tracks. "Apologies to Insect Life" is far more angular and has obvious post-punk influences. 1,942 copies were issued of the 7", each individually named with a British coastal feature. Two different mixes of both songs appear across the releases. The Commander's Croft version of "Carrion" is the one featured on the album.

Track listings

Disk 1 (RTRADESCD092)
 "Carrion (Commander's Croft mix)" (BSP) – 4:04
 "Apologies to Insect Life" (BSP) – 2:51
 "Heavenly Waters" (Hamilton/BSP) – 6:36

Disk 2 (RTRADESCD092X)
"Carrion (Ridgeway mix)" (BSP) – 4:07
"Apologies to Insect Life (Russian Rock demo)" (BSP) – 3:02
"Albert's Eyes" (Yan/BSP) – 3:36

7" Vinyl (RTRADES092)
"Carrion (Ridgeway mix)" (BSP) – 4:07
"Apologies to Insect Life" (BSP) – 2:51

References

External links
 Official website
 "Carrion" at Salty Water (fansite)
 "Apologies to Insect Life" at Salty Water (fansite)

British Sea Power songs
2003 singles
Rough Trade Records singles
2003 songs